KIB, Kib, or KiB may refer to:

 Kib (Jaredite king), one of the Jaredite kings in the Book of Mormon
 Kibibit (Kib)
 Kibibyte (KiB)
 Kodiak Island Borough, Alaska, a borough in the U.S. state of Alaska
 Kunming Institute of Botany